Nanticoke (YTB-803) was a United States Navy .

Construction
The contract for Nanticoke was awarded 4 March 1969. She was laid down on 26 May 1969 at Sturgeon Bay, Wisconsin, by Peterson Builders and launched 14 December 1969.

Operational history

Nanticoke  was placed in service in the 12th Naval District at San Francisco in 1970.

Stricken from the Navy List 9 November 1999, Nanticoke was sold to a private concern and renamed Canal Protector. Ex-Nanticoke was subsequently resold and renamed Robert E. McAllister.

References

External links
 

 

Natick-class large harbor tugs
Ships built by Peterson Builders
1969 ships